WPOW (96.5 FM) – branded Power 96 – is a commercial rhythmic top 40 radio station licensed to Miami, Florida. Owned by Audacy, Inc., the station serves Miami-Dade County, the Miami-Fort Lauderdale metropolitan area, and much of surrounding South Florida. The WPOW studios are located in Audacy's Miami office on Northeast Second Avenue, while the station transmitter resides in the Miami Gardens neighborhood of Andover. Besides a standard analog transmission, WPOW broadcasts over three HD Radio channels, and is available online via Audacy.

History

96.3 FM (1948–1981)

WGBS-FM (96.3) began broadcasting in 1948 as the FM simulcast partner to WGBS (710 AM). It was owned by Storer Broadcasting until the company sold it in 1971 to Bartell Broadcasting. Bartell changed the station, then known as WJHR, into WMYQ, an aggressive Top 40/CHR outlet; the station became known as WMJX in October 1975. An April 1975 use of fake newscasts to promote a contest and fraudulent billing issues led to the Federal Communications Commission refusing to renew WMJX's license, and the station ceased operations on February 15, 1981.

A multi-year fight between applicants ensued for the right to build a station on the frequency. In 1985, Constance J. Wodlinger moved to buy out all of the competing applicants and win the frequency.

WCJX/WPOW
On June 15, 1985, Wodlinger returned 96.3 MHz to the air as WCJX, using the same "96X" moniker that WMJX had used from 1975 to 1981. Technically, WCJX broadcast from all-new studios and the then-new Guy Gannett master candelabra tower. In programming terms, the new station got attention in the marketplace with "The Super 16", a tight rotation of the 16 top hits that ran commercial-free for its early months on the air. WCJX's programming was so tight that the station even placed song schedules in the Miami Herald.

The $2.95 million investment Wodlinger made in buying out her competitors paid off when Beasley Broadcast Group acquired the new station in September 1985 for $10.6 million. On August 4, 1986, at 7 a.m., Beasley flipped the station to a dance-leaning CHR format under the name "Power 96, Miami's fresh new music mix", with a change in call letters to WPOW.  It played mostly dance, pop, freestyle, R&B, hip hop, and a dose of rock-centric type hits that became mass appeal enough to incorporate into the playlist. The first song on "Power 96" was "Rumors" by Timex Social Club. "Power 96" embraced the regionally blossoming Miami Bass sound as well, mixing it into the playlist. The moniker and nickname "Power 96" was the idea of new owner and General Manager Gregory Reed.

Frequency change
WPOW moved from 96.3 MHz to its present-day 96.5 MHz frequency in 1986. Founding General Manager Gregory Reed was originally a part-owner of Beasley-Reed Broadcasting. Later, Reed sold his share of the station to Beasley, but remained as vice president and general manager. The original programming team was a combination of two of WHYI-FM's alums: Program Director and initial morning jock Bill Tanner and Music Director Colleen "The Vinyl Queen" Cassidy, as well as KSFM/Sacramento's music director Jerry Clifton, who was also one of founders of the growing "CHUrban" (also known as "Crossover") phenomenon who continued to help program WPOW until CBS Radio acquired the station in 2014.

Ownership changes
On October 2, 2014, Beasley Broadcasting announced that it would trade five radio stations in Philadelphia and Miami (including WPOW) to CBS Radio in exchange for 14 stations located in Tampa, Charlotte and Philadelphia. The swap was completed on December 1, 2014.

WPOW has included a number of Spanish-language songs in its playlist, including Ivy Queen's 2003 hit "Quiero Bailar" (I Want To Dance), which became the first all Spanish-language song to reach #1 on a Rhythmic Top 40 station. After the ownership change, WPOW began shifting to a more Mainstream Top 40/CHR direction with an increasing amount of Pop product, resulting in Mediabase moving the station to its top 40/CHR panel in November 2015. The station continued to report to Nielsen BDS' Rhythmic Chart until it was moved to the mainstream top 40/CHR panel in June 2016.

On February 2, 2017, CBS Radio announced it would merge with Entercom; The merger was approved on November 9, 2017, and was consummated on the 17th.

Programming 
WPOW personalities include the morning team of Lucy Lopez and DJ Zog; "Mijo" middays; "Ivy Unleashed" afternoons; and "DJ JPS" evenings.

The HD2 digital subchannel airs a simulcast of sister station WQAM, while the HD3 channel carries Audacy's national Channel Q service.

References

External links

 South Florida Radio History web site

POW
Contemporary hit radio stations in the United States
Radio stations established in 1985
1985 establishments in Florida
Audacy, Inc. radio stations